= Self-reference puzzle =

Word puzzle

A self-reference puzzle is a type of logical puzzle where the question in the puzzle refers to the attributes of the puzzle itself. A common example is that a "fill in the blanks" style sentence is given, but what is filled in the blanks can contribute to the sentence itself. An example is "There are _____ e's in this sentence.", for which a solution is "eight" (since including the "eight", there are 8 e's in the sentence).

== Examples ==
- Jim Propp's original SRAT
- Interactive self-referential quizzes
- Self-Referencing Crossword Puzzle
- Self-referencing cryptic crossword
